Rio Verde (Portuguese for "green river") is a river of Goiás state in central Brazil. It is a tributary of the Das Almas River.

See also
List of rivers of Goiás

References

Rivers of Goiás